Antar Zerguelaïne (born 4 January 1985 in Jijel, Algeria) is an Algerian middle distance runner who specializes in the 1500 metres.

Competition record

Personal bests
800 metres - 1:46.56 min (2005)
1500 metres - 3:31.95 min (2005)

External links

1985 births
Living people
People from Jijel
Algerian male middle-distance runners
Olympic athletes of Algeria
Athletes (track and field) at the 2008 Summer Olympics
Mediterranean Games silver medalists for Algeria
Athletes (track and field) at the 2009 Mediterranean Games
African Games silver medalists for Algeria
African Games medalists in athletics (track and field)
Mediterranean Games medalists in athletics
Athletes (track and field) at the 2007 All-Africa Games
Islamic Solidarity Games competitors for Algeria
Islamic Solidarity Games medalists in athletics
21st-century Algerian people
20th-century Algerian people